Thomas (died after 1163) was a Hungarian noble in the second half of the 12th century. Anti-king Stephen IV of Hungary, who usurped the crown of his nephew, Stephen III, appointed him Palatine of Hungary in 1163. Meanwhile, Héder was considered the rightful holder of the dignity in the court of Stephen III.

His name is appeared once in the only surviving extant royal charter of Stephen IV, who issued the document in Esztergom, where Thomas belonged to his entourage. Thomas was deprived from his position, when Stephen IV was decisively defeated and captured by his nephew in the battle of Székesfehérvár on 19 June 1163. Thomas' fate is unknown. It is plausible that he is not identical with that namesake lord, who served as palatine in the 1180s, during the reign of Béla III.

References

Sources 

 
 
 

12th-century Hungarian people
Palatines of Hungary